Swimbaits or swimmers are a loosely defined class of fishing lures that are designed to primarily imitate the underwater swimming motions of baitfishes.

History 
Swimbaits originated in the late 1980s as lures designed to imitate rainbow trout in Southern California reservoirs that largemouth bass and striped bass fed on. They were larger and more lifelike imitations than most available mass-produced lures at the time.

Types 
Swimbaits are mainly broken down into 2 categories: hard body and soft body swimbaits.

Hard-body 
Hard-body swimbaits are often made of either a wood or plastic material. The goal of these baits is to mimic a baitfish in which a predatory fish (such as largemouth bass, smallmouth bass, spotted bass, pike, trout etc.) would eat. These baits are designed to have a swimming action that will provoke a predatory instinct from the fish that cause it to strike the lure. The action of the lure varies based on the number of joints in the bait. A hard body bait with a single joint (or more commonly known as a glide bait) provides an serpentine or "gliding" action in the water which can be fished on a variety of retrieve methods and speeds. Multi-jointed hard baits provided a more of a natural swimming appearance to the bait but can also provide some unique action with different retrieve styles and speeds.

Soft-body 
Soft-body swimbaits are almost exclusively made out of rubber or soft plastic not unlike what your favorite package of artificial worms are made of. Some soft body swimbaits are designed to draw a strike from fish while very detailed baits (usually top hook) rely more on looks than actions. Soft body swimbaits have several sub-categories including paddle tails, line through, and top hook swimbaits. Paddle tail swimbaits are by far the most common swimbait many anglers use. These baits come in an array of sizes with the smaller sizes often being used as a trailer for a spinnerbait, chatterbait or underspin. The larger sizes however are seen often being fished on a swimbait Jig head or a weighted extra wide gap hook (ewg). The paddle tail swimbait also comes in either a solid body and hollow body. Line through swimbaits are a large swimbait which allows the line to run through the body of the bait to keep the fish from using the bait as leverage to thrown the hook. Top hook swimbaits are swimbaits which utilize a large, strong, jig style hook which protrudes from the top of the swimbait.  The top hook swimbait will typically have a wedge style tail that's designed for colder water.

References

External links
 'Top Ten Swimbait Picks in my Box' -  TheWiredAngler article with images

Fishing equipment